The Sixth Shot (Swedish: Sjätte skottet) is a 1943 Swedish drama film directed by Hasse Ekman and starring Edvin Adolphson, Karin Ekelund and Gunn Wållgren.

Plot summary 
Two people who feel unsuccessful meet one evening in Monte Carlo. Georg Winkler even plans to commit suicide, but he is hindered by Marguerite Hoffman and they start discussing their lives over a drink. They agree to start a new life together.

Georg's talent is pistol shooting and Marguerite has been an actress, but not a successful one. They now start touring under the name "Hard & Hardy", where Georg uses his pistol in a lethally dangerous number with Marguerite as a target. They are now touring with a hit number, happy and in love. But even the best of plans can go terribly wrong...

Cast 
Edvin Adolphson as Georg Winkler, "Mr. Hard"
Karin Ekelund as Marguerite Hoffman, "Miss Hardy" 
Gunn Wållgren as Lulu 
Nils Lundell as Toni, the clown 
Olof Widgren as Björn Hoffman
Tore Lindwall as Chief Superintendent
David Erikson as stablekeeper
Sten Hedlund as  police commissary  
Nils Johannisson as Director Möller 
Wiktor "Kulörten" Andersson as Carnival Barker
Otto Moskovitz as Kiki, dwarf at Cirkus Zoo 
Willi Wells as Danish konferencier
 Agda Helin as Vera Violetta 
 Mimi Nelson as 	Ung dam på kaféet i Paris
 Artur Rolén as Ceremonimästare
 Siegfried Fischer as 	Man in häkte

References

Bibliography 
 Gustafsson, Fredrik. The Man from the Third Row: Hasse Ekman, Swedish Cinema and the Long Shadow of Ingmar Bergman. Berghahn Books, 2016.
 Qvist, Per Olov & von Bagh, Peter. Guide to the Cinema of Sweden and Finland. Greenwood Publishing Group, 2000.

External links 
 

1943 films
Films directed by Hasse Ekman
1940s Swedish-language films
Swedish drama films
1943 drama films
Swedish black-and-white films
1940s Swedish films